Eupselia beltera is a moth in the family Depressariidae. It was described by Alfred Jefferis Turner in 1947. It is found in Australia, where it has been recorded from Queensland, New South Wales, Victoria, South Australia and Western Australia.

The larvae are thought to feed on the foliage of Eucalyptus species.

References

Moths described in 1947
Eupselia